Lenin Preciado (born 23 August 1993) is an Ecuadorian judoka. He won a gold medal in men's 60 kg at the 2015 Pan American Games.

He competed at the 2016 Summer Olympics in Rio de Janeiro, in the men's 60 kg.

He represented Ecuador at the 2020 Summer Olympics.

References

External links
 
 

1993 births
Living people
Ecuadorian male judoka
Olympic judoka of Ecuador
Judoka at the 2016 Summer Olympics
Pan American Games medalists in judo
Pan American Games gold medalists for Ecuador
Judoka at the 2015 Pan American Games
Judoka at the 2019 Pan American Games
South American Games gold medalists for Ecuador
South American Games medalists in judo
Competitors at the 2018 South American Games
Medalists at the 2015 Pan American Games
Medalists at the 2019 Pan American Games
Judoka at the 2020 Summer Olympics
People from Machala
21st-century Ecuadorian people